Gallagher Elementary School can mean one of the following:

Hugh Gallagher Elementary School, Virginia City, Nevada
Gallagher Elementary School (Codename: Kids Next Door), fictional
Joseph M Gallagher Elementary School, Ohio
Arthur J. Gallagher Elementary School, Florida